Srđan Andrić (born 5 January 1980) is a Croatian former professional footballer who played as a defensive midfielder. He was most recently the youth academy director of Hajduk Split.

Club career
Andrić started his career with Croatia's Hajduk Split. He made his debut for the club in the 1999–2000 Prva HNL aged 19 years old. He spent the next four seasons at Hajduk, becoming the captain for the 2003-04 season.

Andric then moved to Greek giants Panathinaikos in 2004 in a deal worth €150k.

He was released from Panathinaikos upon the expiration of his contract in May 2007, before rejoining Hajduk. He quickly became club captain again after the departure of Mirko Hrgović.

After over 100 appearances and five years in his second stint at the Split based side, on 1 August 2012, he joined UAE Pro-League outfit Al-Wahda for the 2012-13 season. After a relatively unsuccessful season in the UAE, he retired from football in 2013.

In total, Andric made 266 appearances for Hajduk over his two stints.

International career
He made his debut for Croatia in a March 2002 friendly match against Slovenia and has earned a total of 2 caps, scoring 1 goal. His final international was a February 2003 friendly draw with Macedonia in which game he scored the final goal of the game.

Post playing career
Hajduk announced that he had been appointed the chief of the youth academy on 19 March 2014, after a period out of the game. On 24 May 2016, he resigned as youth academy director after his contract was not renewed.

Career stats

Last updated on 9 July 2012

References

External links
 
 
 
 
 Srđan Andrić at Sportnet.hr 

1980 births
Living people
Sportspeople from Dubrovnik
Association football central defenders
Association football midfielders
Croatian footballers
Croatia youth international footballers
Croatia under-21 international footballers
Croatia international footballers
HNK Hajduk Split players
Panathinaikos F.C. players
Al Wahda FC players
Croatian Football League players
Super League Greece players
UAE Pro League players
Croatian expatriate footballers
Expatriate footballers in Greece
Croatian expatriate sportspeople in Greece
Expatriate footballers in the United Arab Emirates
Croatian expatriate sportspeople in the United Arab Emirates